Meerganj  Assembly constituency is one of the 403 constituencies of the Uttar Pradesh Legislative Assembly,  India. It is a part of the Bareilly district and  one of the five assembly constituencies in the Bareilly Lok Sabha constituency. First election in this assembly constituency was held in  2012 after the "Delimitation of Parliamentary and Assembly  Constituencies Order, 2008" was passed and the constituency was formed  in 2008. The constituency is assigned identification number 119.

Wards  / Areas
Extant  of Meerganj Assembly constituency is Meerganj Tehsil. There are two blocks in this constituency, Fatehgarh west and Meerganj.

Members of the Legislative Assembly

Election results

2022

2017

See also
Bareilly Lok Sabha constituency
Bareilly district
Sixteenth Legislative Assembly of Uttar Pradesh
Uttar Pradesh Legislative Assembly
Vidhan Bhawan

References

External links
 

Assembly constituencies of Uttar Pradesh
Politics of Bareilly district
Constituencies established in 2008